The Lick Creek Guard Station is a Forest Service Guard Station located in the Wallowa–Whitman National Forest near Enterprise, Oregon. The station was constructed by the Civilian Conservation Corps during the Great Depression. The wooden building was built in a rustic style; its walls were constructed with shiplap, and its gable roof has wood shingles. The building's design also includes a gabled porch, a stone interior chimney, and double-hung sash windows.

The Lick Creek Guard Station was added to the National Register of Historic Places on April 8, 1986.

References

External links

National Register of Historic Places in Wallowa County, Oregon
Buildings and structures in Wallowa County, Oregon
Park buildings and structures on the National Register of Historic Places in Oregon
Civilian Conservation Corps in Oregon
Wallowa–Whitman National Forest